Dion Leonard Sembie-Ferris (born 23 May 1996) is an English footballer who plays for  side Scunthorpe United, where he plays as a winger.

Sembie-Ferris began his footballing career with Peterborough United at the age of nine, but was released in 2008, moving to Peterborough Junior Alliance side Netherton Vultures. He later joined St Neots Town, where he broke into the first-team at the age of 17. After impressing Colchester United scouts, he made a move to the League One club's Academy in November 2013. He made his professional debut for Colchester in January 2015, and later had a loan spells with National League South sides Margate and Concord Rangers. He was released by Colchester in August 2017 and made a return to St Neots the same month.

Career

Early career
Born in Peterborough, Sembie-Ferris attended Leighton Primary School then Bushfield School in his hometown, while on the books at Peterborough United between the ages of nine and twelve. He was released by Peterborough in 2008, joining Netherton United junior side Netherton Vultures in the Peterborough Junior Alliance. Sembie-Ferris was a member of the under-14s side that won the 2010 ET Sports 'Team of the Year' award. He continued his football education at the Tresham Academy, where he helped the under-21 team to the Central Conference reserve league title in 2013.

After graduating from the Academy, Sembie-Ferris joined Southern League Premier Division side St Neots Town to continue his development. During his brief stay with the club, he had a trial with West Ham United, and made his debut for St Neots in the Huntingdonshire Senior Cup final on 3 May 2013, a game which his side won against Huntingdon Town after a penalty shoot-out. He made four appearances in the Southern League during the early stages of the 2013–14 season.

Colchester United
After a six-week trial with League One side Colchester United's Academy, Sembie-Ferris was offered a contract until the end of the 2013–14 season with a view to earning a Professional Development contract after impressing academy manager Tony Humes. During his first season with Colchester, Sembie-Ferris helped the Colchester under-18 side to a Youth Alliance South East league title and Youth Alliance Cup double, playing 78 minutes in the final on 29 April 2014, as the U's beat Bradford City 4–2 at Valley Parade.

2014–15 season
Now first-team manager, Tony Humes had been impressed by Sembie-Ferris' performances at under-21 level. Humes selected Sembie-Ferris to travel with the first-team for Colchester's League One game against Crewe Alexandra on 27 September, although he was an unused substitute.

Sembie-Ferris made his first-team debut for Colchester on 2 January 2015, coming on as an 85th-minute substitute for Elliott Hewitt in their 3–1 FA Cup third round defeat to Cardiff City at the Cardiff City Stadium. Following his debut, Sembie-Ferris set his sights on making a league debut, saying that it was a "great feeling" to make his professional bow, and that his aim was to "get an appearance in the league and hopefully push on from there". The fixture that followed Colchester's FA Cup tie was a league match at his former and hometown club, Peterborough United, on 10 January. Sembie-Ferris stated that he was "desperate to play at London Road. Despite missing the 2–0 win, Sembie-Ferris made his league and home debut in the following game, again replacing Elliott Hewitt after 79 minutes of Colchester's 2–0 defeat to Walsall on 17 January. He made his first start for the club in their 2–0 home win over Yeovil Town on 17 March, playing 71 minutes before being substituted for Gavin Massey.

Utilised mainly as a late substitute by Tony Humes, Sembie-Ferris put this to good effect on 25 April in Colchester's game away to Fleetwood Town. He came off the bench in the 73rd minute to replace Alex Gilbey, and won his side a penalty in the 87th minute, which was duly converted by Chris Porter to win the game 3–2 and turn around a 2–1 deficit. Humes praised Sembie-Ferris' impact, hailing him as an "exciting prospect". After ending the season with eleven appearances in all competitions in the 2014–15 season, Sembie-Ferris signed a new three-year contract with Colchester on 15 May 2015.

2015–16 season and Margate loan
After making a handful of appearances for Colchester in the early stages of the 2015–16 season and none since new manager Kevin Keen arrived in December 2015, Sembie-Ferris was allowed to leave the club on loan. He joined National League South side Margate on 24 March 2016 until the end of the season. He made his debut in Margate's 4–1 defeat at Wealdstone on 26 March, playing the full 90-minutes. He went on to make five appearances for the club.

He made ten first-team appearances for Colchester over the course of the campaign.

2016–17 season and Concord Rangers loan
Sembie-Ferris scored his first goal for Colchester on 4 October 2016 in their 2–1 EFL Trophy defeat to Southampton U23 at the Colchester Community Stadium.

In December 2016, Sembie-Ferris was again allowed to leave the club on loan, joining National League South side Concord Rangers for one month. He made his debut as a substitute on 26 December in Concord's 1–1 home draw with East Thurrock United. He scored twice against St Albans City on 28 January 2017, his second a 91st-minute winner with Concord recording a 3–2 victory. On 24 February, Sembie-Ferris' loan at Concord was extended until the end of the season. He made 20 appearances for the Beach Boys during his loan spell scoring four goals.

He scored one goal in ten first-team appearances for Colchester across the campaign. He was released from his contract by mutual consent in August 2017.

Return to St Neots Town
In August 2017, Sembie-Ferris made a return to his former club St Neots Town, saying that he had "unfinished business" at the club.

Peterborough Sports
Following financial issues at St Neots Town, Dion signed for Southern League Division One Central side Peterborough Sports in November 2018.

Scunthorpe United
On the 2nd February 2023, Sembie-Ferris was announced as a new signing for Scunthorpe United

Career statistics

Honours
St Neots Town
2012–13 Huntingdonshire Senior Cup winner

Colchester United U18
2013–14 Football League Youth Alliance South East winner
2013–14 Football League Youth Alliance Cup winner

References

External links

1996 births
Living people
Sportspeople from Peterborough
English footballers
Black British sportspeople
Association football wingers
Peterborough United F.C. players
St Neots Town F.C. players
Colchester United F.C. players
Margate F.C. players
Concord Rangers F.C. players
Peterborough Sports F.C. players
Scunthorpe United F.C. players
Southern Football League players
English Football League players
National League (English football) players